Moldoveni may refer to several places in Romania:

 Moldoveni, Ialomița, a commune in Ialomița County
 Moldoveni, Neamț, a commune in Neamț County
 Moldoveni, a village in Islaz Commune, Teleorman County

and to:

Baurci-Moldoveni, a commune in Cahul District, Moldova